The Brown Farmstead is located on Browns Road in the Town of Montgomery, east of Walden, in Orange County, New York, United States. The farmhouse was built about 1834, and is a two-story, side passage Greek Revival style.  It was modified on the interior and exterior in 1879, in the Queen Anne style.  Also on the property is a contributing 20th century dairy barn.  It is the home of the Browns, who settled that region and gave their name to the road that runs past the house.  They obtained this property in 1828.

It was added to the National Register of Historic Places in 2005.

References

1828 establishments in New York (state)
Houses on the National Register of Historic Places in New York (state)
Greek Revival architecture in New York (state)
Queen Anne architecture in New York (state)
Houses completed in 1834
Houses in Orange County, New York
National Register of Historic Places in Orange County, New York